Proraso is a personal care and grooming brand owned by the Italian company Ludovico Martelli srl. The brand includes men's barber supplies and scented shaving products, and consists of five different product lines aimed at the general public and a "Pro" line aimed at professional barbers, which contains three variants. The Proraso pre-shave cream has been in production since 1948.

In 2009, the company's turnover was over 36 million euros, ranking sixth in the national market in the production of rapid foams, third for shaving cream with brush and first in the market for pre and after shave creams. In 2017, the turnover marks an all-time high, reaching 61 million euros, an increase of 18% compared to the previous year.

Products
The Proraso brand includes five main product lines, four of which are marketed internationally.

 "Green" line products, marketed in green packaging and designed for general use. This line is scented primarily with eucalyptus oil and menthol, and is the first line of products introduced. It contains pre-shaving cream, shaving soap, shaving cream, beard shampoo, beard balm, beard oil, shaving foam, aftershave lotion and after shave balm.
 "White" line products, marketed in white packaging and designed for sensitive skin, containing green tea and oatmeal extracts. This line is scented with lime and apple. It does not have an aftershave lotion equivalent.
 "Red" line products, marketed in red packaging and designed to soften coarser hair, containing shea butter. This line is scented with sandalwood. It does not have an after shave balm equivalent.
 "Blue" line products, marketed in blue packaging and designed to moisturize, containing vitamin E and aloe vera extract. This line is scented with musk and "amber". The blue line contains only shaving cream, shaving foam and after shave balm. Recently a pre-shaving cream was introduced for this line.
 "Yellow" line products, marketed in yellow packaging and designed to provide a close shave and moisturize, containing cocoa butter and shea butter. This line is scented with vanilla, and contains only one product, shaving foam. This line is not sold outside Italy.

There is also the "Single Blade" line which contains three variants directed to professionals. This line offers much more complex fragrances in the products.
 "Wood and Spice" line products are marketed in yellow packaging. This line is scented with cumin, saffron, cedar and sandalwood. It contains pre-shaving cream, shaving cream, after-shave balm, cologne, beard shampoo, beard balm, beard oil, moustache wax and hot beard treatment oil.
 "Azur Lime" line products are marketed in dark blue packaging. This line is scented with lime, mint, woods, juniper berries, musk and patchouli. It contains pre-shaving cream, shaving cream, after-shave balm, cologne, beard shampoo, beard balm and beard oil.
 "Cypress & Vetyver" line products are marketed in dark green packaging. This line is scented with cypress, bergamot, vetiver, cedarwood and amber. It contains pre-shaving cream, shaving cream, after-shave balm, cologne, beard shampoo, beard balm and beard oil.

The brand also includes a shaving brush and a metallic after-shave vaporizer among other accessories for professional barbers.

References

Bibliography

External links

 Official website (English)
 Official website (Italian)

Italian brands
Perfumes
Soap brands
Shaving cream brands